Mezquita were a Spanish rock band. In 1979, they released Recuerdos de mi tierra, a mix of flamenco-rock and progressive rock. They released a second album, Califas del rock, in 1981.

Flamenco-rock
Spanish progressive rock groups